Bolgur, also rendered as Bowlgur, may refer to:
 Bala Bolgur
 Pain Bolgur